The Full Monty is a comedy play written by Simon Beaufoy, from his original screenplay for the 1997 film The Full Monty. It made its world premiere at the Lyceum Theatre, Sheffield in February 2013, before touring the United Kingdom. A West End production was launched at the Noël Coward Theatre in February 2014. A new production opened at the Manchester Opera House on Thursday 11 September 2014 and tours the UK through to May 2015.

The play features music by Tom Jones, Hot Chocolate and James Brown.

Background 
The Full Monty is written by Simon Beaufoy and marked his first attempt at writing for theatre. It is based on his own screenplay for the 1997 film of the same name. The film itself was made on a budget of £3 million and was a sleeper hit, earning over £160 million in global box office receipts becoming the highest-grossing film in the UK at the time. It was nominated for four Academy Awards, winning Best Original Score and received eleven Bafta Award nominations, winning four, including Best Film. The film is set in Sheffield, England, and it tells the story of six unemployed men, four of them former steel workers, who decide to form a male striptease act in order to gather enough money to get somewhere else in life and for main character, Gaz, to be able to see his son. An americanised musical adaption was launched in 2000, transferring to the West End's Prince of Wales Theatre in 2002.

Music in the play includes You Sexy Thing by Hot Chocolate, You Can Leave Your Hat On by Tom Jones, I Got You (I Feel Good) by James Brown, Hot Stuff by Donna Summer, Flashdance... What a Feeling by Irene Cara, The Stripper by David Rose, Je t'aime... moi non plus by Serge Gainsbourg and Land of a Thousand Dances by Wilson Pickett.

The play returns the story back to its Sheffield origins, rather than the Buffalo set musical. On the move back Beaufoy said  "Without Sheffield, there would be no Full Monty. It's been a long road – via Hollywood – but finally the characters are coming back home to the place it all started."

Production history

Original production and tour 
In May 2012, it was announced The Full Monty would receive its world premiere in Sheffield in 2013. The play premiered at the Lyceum Theatre, Sheffield on 2 February 2013, running until 23 February. The production was directed by Daniel Evans, with choreography by Steven Hoggett, design by Robert Jones, lighting by Tim Lutkin and original music and sound design by Max and Ben Ringham. The lead cast for the show included Kenny Doughty as Gaz, Sidney Cole as Horse, Craig Gazey as Lomper, Roger Morlidge as Dave, Kieran O'Brien as Guy and Simon Rouse as Gerald. Following its debut in Sheffield the play embarked on an eleven venue tour visiting Birmingham, Bristol, Canterbury, Aberdeen, Belfast, Edinburgh, Dublin, Salford, Southampton, Southend On Sea and Leeds.

London transfer 
In January 2014, the production began a short pre-West End run at the New Theatre, Cardiff, followed by the Theatre Royal in Bath. The show then transferred to the West End's Noël Coward Theatre, where it began previews on 20 February 2014, before holding its official opening night on 25 February, booking until 14 June 2014. The original tour cast stayed with the production and tickets for the previews were sold at 1990's prices. The play received a Laurence Olivier Award nomination for Best New Comedy. On 16 March, it was announced the show would close early after just five weeks on 29 March, due to poor sales. The move surprised critics and cast alike, with an online petition also being launched. The petition was signed by the shows writer Simon Beaufoy, who said of the show's producers David Pugh and Dafydd Rogers, "Why would a producer close his own show before it had any chance of finding an audience?" and "On the other hand, why would a producer never come to see his own show? Perhaps he can answer these questions. I can't because he hasn't spoken either to me or the creative team in months." The petition had no effect in terms of extending the productions run and the play closed on 29 March, to be replaced by Good People.

2014–present tour 
A new production embarked on a 32-week tour of the United Kingdom, commencing at the Manchester Opera House, on 11 September 2014. Featuring a new cast the show was seen in major venues throughout Britain  finishing back at Sheffield's Lyceum Theatre in June 2015. A second touring production is directed by Roger Haines and casting includes Gary Lucy as Gaz, Louis Emerick as Horse, Bobby Schofield as Lomper, Martin Miller as Dave, Rupert Hill as Guy and Andrew Dunn as Gerald. A typical London performance ran two hours and 25 minutes, including one interval of 20 minutes.

The tour continued in September 2015, with the same cast, mostly performing in coastal resorts. The tour continued from September 2016. Lucy, Emerick and Dunn continue in their roles, with new cast members Anthony Lewis as Lomper, Kai Owen as Dave, Chris Fountain as Guy & Fiona Skinner as Jean. The Tour was Directed by Jack Ryder, with Choreographer Ian West, Assistant Director James Robert-Moore, Designer Rob Jones, and Lighting by Tim Lutkin.

Principal roles and original cast

Awards and nominations

London production

References

External links 
 

2013 plays
Comedy plays
English plays
West End plays